The Miserable Mill is the fourth novel of the children's novel series A Series of Unfortunate Events by Lemony Snicket. In this novel, the Baudelaire orphans live with the owner of Lucky Smells Lumber Mill. The book was published on April 15, 2000, by HarperCollins and illustrated by Brett Helquist.

Plot summary
Violet, Klaus and Sunny Baudelaire are traveling on a train heading for Paltryville, the location of the children's new home, the Lucky Smells Lumbermill.

Upon arrival, the children learn that they will have to work at the mill, but as part of the deal, their new guardian, Sir (whose name is impossible to pronounce otherwise), will try to keep Count Olaf, their nemesis, away. They meet Sir's more sympathetic partner, Charles, who shows them the library, which contains three books, one about the history of the lumbermill, one about the town constitution, and one donated by Dr. Georgina Orwell, the local optometrist, who lives in an eye-shaped building, which also resembles, suspiciously, the tattoo on their nemesis Count Olaf's ankle.

Klaus breaks his own glasses when he is purposely tripped by the new foreman, Flacutono, and is sent to see Dr. Orwell. When Klaus returns from the optometrist, hours later, he acts strangely, as if in a trance.  The next day in the lumbermill, Flacutono instructs Klaus to operate a stamping machine. Klaus causes an accident by dropping the machine on Phil, an optimistic coworker. Flacutono exclaims that the machine "cost an inordinate amount of money". The other workers ask what the unfamiliar word means and Klaus defines the word. Klaus explains that he doesn't remember what happened between when he broke his glasses and waking up in the mill. Foreman Flacutono trips him again, once again causing his glasses to break. This time though, Violet and Sunny accompany Klaus to Dr. Orwell's office.

Together, they arrive at the eye-shaped building they saw on their arrival to Lucky Smells. Dr. Orwell, seemingly friendly, lets them in, and tells Violet and Sunny to sit in the waiting room. Violet and Sunny realize that Count Olaf is disguised as Shirley, a receptionist and that Klaus has been (and is being) hypnotized by Orwell, who is in cahoots with Olaf. They leave with Klaus, who is once again in a trance, and calls Violet "Veronica." When they return to the lumbermill, they find a memo from Sir informing them that if there is another accident, he'll place them under Shirley's care.

Violet and Sunny put Klaus to bed, and go to the mill's library. Violet reads the book donated by Orwell, a difficult task given her lack of vocabulary compared to the book's usage of difficult words, and learns that Orwell's technique uses a command word to control the subject and an "unhypnotize" word. They then hear the lumbermill starting early, and rush to see what is happening. They find Charles strapped to a log which Klaus is pushing through a buzz saw, and Foreman Flacutono giving orders. The girls notice Klaus' bare feet, a clue that he has been hypnotized out of bed yet again. Shirley and Orwell arrive and the latter orders Klaus to ignore his sisters. Violet realizes the release word ("inordinate") just in time. Violet is caught by Shirley and Flacutono, but Klaus manages to set Charles free by trying to invent a fishing rod. Sunny and Orwell duel, with Orwell's sword and Sunny's teeth; as Mr. Poe and Sir unexpectedly enter the room, Orwell steps back in surprise, into the path of the buzz saw, and dies.

Count Olaf is locked in the library but escapes out the window with Foreman Flacutono, who is revealed to be the bald man with the long nose in disguise. Sir relinquishes the Baudelaires, leaving them without care again.

Foreshadowing
The last picture of The Miserable Mill shows two students (a boy and a girl) preparing to board in a school bus. This is clearly a reference to Duncan and Isadora Quagmire, and to all the events of the next book: The Austere Academy, the fifth book.

References in book
Whilst describing hypnosis, it is said "A British author was hypnotised with the word Bloomsbury and wrote several books". This is a possible reference to J. K. Rowling and the acceptance of her debut novel from Bloomsbury Publishing.

The name Georgina Orwell is most likely a reference to George Orwell, famed for his novels (prominently amongst them 1984, to which there are several other references in the series).

Translations
  (Low Spirits Lumbermill), Cia. das Letras, 2000, 
  (The Miser's Mill), WSOY, 2003, " (Nightmare at the Sawmill)
  (The Factory of Doom), 
  (The Crazy Logs) 2004, 
  (The Mysterious Mill)
  (Sinister Sawmill), Azbuka, 2005, 
  (The Lugubrious Mill)
  (The Strange Sawmill)
  (The Depleted Forest)
  (The Helish Sawmill)
  (The Torture Lumber Mill)
  (The Brutal Lumber Mill)
 , Nanmeebooks Teen, 2003,

Adaptations
The book was adapted into the seventh and eighth episodes of the first season of the television series adaptation produced by Netflix. The episodes mirror the book's plot relatively closely, with some scenes and characters changed, such as "Flacutono" being the Hook-Handed Man in the TV series as opposed to the Bald Man in the book. The sword fight between Dr. Orwell and Sunny is removed, and as a result, Dr. Orwell dies by being thrown into the furnace instead of being cut in half by the buzzsaw. Additionally, there are major differences as to the fate of the mill and the town; the town was not burned down in the book, and the other staff were not hypnotized.

See also

References

External links
 Lemony Snicket's website

2000 American novels
2000 children's books
Books in A Series of Unfortunate Events
Cross-dressing in literature
HarperCollins books
Fiction about hypnosis
American novels adapted into television shows
Sequel novels